Tmesisternus oblongus is a species of beetle in the family Cerambycidae. It was described by Jean Baptiste Boisduval in 1835. It is known from Indonesia.

References

oblongus
Beetles described in 1835